Épinal is a commune in northeastern France and the prefecture of the Vosges department.

Geography

Population

In 2018, 32,223 people lived in the town proper, while its functional area had a population of 119,955.

Main sights
The old town centre features the Place des Vosges, the Chapitre district, Saint-Maurice's Basilica, medieval castle remains and the Roman House (11th and 13th centuries). It is also known for its parks and gardens, as well as a large communal forest with arboretum (the Arboretum de la Forêt d'Épinal).

There are major fortifications, extended and maintained until the early 20th century. There is a legend, among the populace of Épinal, that Napoleon's ghost strolls the wall ramparts on 9 September of each year at 05:00. It was on this day and at this time that, in 1811, Napoleon gave his first and last oration to the city of Épinal, wherein he addressed the challenges posed by northern expansion.

The Epinal American Cemetery and Memorial on the outskirts of the town where United States service members killed in World War II are buried.

Notable residents 
 Isabelle Cogitore (born 1964), historian 
 Jean-Baptiste Jacopin (1755–1811), general of the armies of the 1st Republic and the First French Empire.
 Victor Magnien (1802–1885), violinist, guitarist and composer
 Émile Durkheim (1858–1917), founder of sociology 
 Louis Lapicque (1866–1952), physiologist, specialist of the nervous system and known for his discovery of the chronaxie.
 Marcel Mauss (1872–1950), father of French modern ethnography and nephew of Émile Durkheim.
 Marc Boegner (1881–1970), writer, thinker and pastor, president of the Fédération protestante de France and the World Council of Churches, a member of the Académie française.
 Henry Daniel-Rops (1901–1965), writer and historian
 Jean-Marie Cavada (1940) journalist and politician.
 Léo Valentin (1919–1956), French soldier and adventurer, nicknamed "l'homme-oiseau".
 Marceline Loridan-Ivens (1928), film director
 Philippe Séguin (1943–2010), Mayor of Épinal, French politician, President of the Court of Auditors under the Fifth Republic.
 Ségolène Royal (1953), completed her high school in Charmes, before joining the Lycée Saint-Joseph of Épinal in 1968.
 Laetitia Masson (1966), screenwriter and film director
 Valérie Donzelli (1973), actress and film director
 Jeanne Cressanges, novelist, essayist
 Nicolas Matthieu (1978), writer, winner of the Prix Erckmann-Chatrian in 2014.
 Maria Pourchet, (1980), writer, winner of the Prix Erckmann-Chatrian in 2013.
 Marie-Antoinette Gout, Righteous Among the Nations

Sportspeople 
 Gauthier Klauss (1987), canoeist.
 Matthieu Péché (1987), canoeist
 Aurore Mongel (1982), swimmer
 Damien Nazon (1974), rider
 Jean-Patrick Nazon (1977), rider
 Julien Bontemps (1979), windsurfer
 Maxime Mermoz (1986), rugby player
 Nacer Bouhanni (1990), rider
 Rayane Bouhanni (1996), brother of the former, also a rider
 Grégory Gaultier (1982), 2015 squash world champion

Economy
Épinal is best known for the "Images d'Épinal" – which is now a common expression in French language – the popular prints created by a local company, the Imagerie d'Épinal, formerly known as the Imagerie Pellerin. These stencil-colored woodcuts of military subjects, Napoleonic history, storybook characters and other folk themes were widely distributed throughout the 19th century. The company still exists today, and still uses its hand-operated presses to produce the antique images. Other local industries include textiles, metals, morocco leather, precision instruments, and bicycles. There is a school of textile weaving.

Politics

Épinal is contained within Vosges' 1st constituency for elections to the National Assembly.

Education
The engineering College École nationale supérieure des technologies et industries du bois dedicated to wood Industry is located in the city.

Sport
SAS Épinal is based in the commune.

International relations

Épinal is twinned with:

 Bitola, North Macedonia
 Chieri, Italy
 Gembloux, Belgium
 La Crosse, United States
 Loughborough, England, United Kingdom
 Nový Jičín, Czech Republic
 Schwäbisch Hall, Germany

See also
Communes of the Vosges department

References

External links

 Official site
La place forte d'Épinal 1870 – 1914
 
 Épinal-Tribu Information about Épinal (in French)
 Épinal-info (in French)
 City council website (in French)
 HoloGuides: Épinal – photos

 
Communes of Vosges (department)
Prefectures in France
Vosges communes articles needing translation from French Wikipedia
Duchy of Lorraine